Hong Kong Defence Force may refer to:
Hong Kong Defence Force (Imperial Japanese Army), the Japanese garrison between 1942 and 1945
British Forces Overseas Hong Kong, until 1997
Royal Hong Kong Regiment
Hong Kong Garrison, the Chinese People's Liberation Army force in Hong Kong since 1997

Military units and formations disambiguation pages